San José del Valle is a municipality located in the province of Cádiz, southern Spain.

References

External links
San José del Valle - Sistema de Información Multiterritorial de Andalucía

Municipalities of the Province of Cádiz